South Farnham School is a coeducational academy in Farnham, Surrey, England.  It is located on two separate sites, with the Infants Section for children aged 4–7 at The Bourne site (formerly the Bourne Infants School) in the Lower Bourne, and the Junior Section for children aged 7–11 at the main school site at Menin Way.

History

The school was originally built in 1938 as the Farnham Girls' Grammar School, which was opened by Princess Alice, Duchess of Gloucester in 1939 and closed in 1973.

In 2011 the Bourne Infants School merged with South Farnham School, and teaching now takes place on two sites.  Reception through Year 2 (ages 4–7) are taught at the Bourne site, and Years 3–6 (ages 7–11) are taught at the Menin Way site.

Reputation 
The school has a very impressive reputation and has topped the state school exam league tables for many years.

The school is also a teaching school, taking the project lead role in the Surrey South Farnham School Centred Teacher Training project.

Clubs

Many activities and clubs take place at the end of the normal school day. At present a choice of over 30 out-of-school activities are available including choir, netball and football.

Facilities

The accommodation at South Farnham School includes seven libraries, a music suite and four practical rooms. There is an assembly hall, two studios, gymnasium, cloakrooms and changing rooms. The  of play area include three astroturf courts, grassed sports fields and pavilion.

Notable pupils

Farnham Girls' Grammar School

 Liza Goddard, TV and Stage Actress

South Farnham Primary School
 Rachel Morris, paralympic handcyclist

References

External links
 Website of South Farnham School
 Website of Farnham Girls' Grammar School Old Girls' Association

Educational institutions established in 1938
Primary schools in Surrey
Academies in Surrey
1938 establishments in England
Farnham